Antal Szalay (12 March 1912 – 4 April 1960) was a Hungarian footballer who played for Újpest FC, as well as representing the Hungarian national football team at the 1934 and the 1938 FIFA World Cup. He went on to coach UTA Arad, FC Craiova, Carrarese Calcio, Pro Patria and St. George-Budapest.

References

1912 births
1960 deaths
1934 FIFA World Cup players
1938 FIFA World Cup players
Hungarian footballers
Hungarian football managers
Hungary international footballers
Újpest FC players
Association football midfielders
Hungarian expatriate sportspeople in Italy
Hungarian expatriate sportspeople in Romania
Hungarian expatriate football managers
Expatriate football managers in Romania
Expatriate football managers in Italy